Aelurillus subaffinis is a jumping spider species in the genus Aelurillus. The female was first described in 1947 by Ludovico di Caporiacco.

Distribution
The species has been found in Ethiopia. It has been identified in Eritrea and may have a distribution that extends as far as Tanzania.

References

Salticidae
Fauna of Ethiopia
Fauna of Eritrea
Spiders of Africa
Spiders described in 1947